Sergio Mendes Presents Lobo is a 1970 album by Edu Lobo, produced by Sergio Mendes.

Reception

Billboard magazine reviewed the album in their April 24, 1971 issue and wrote that ""To Say Goodbye" and "Ponterio" are outstanding vocals".

Richard S. Ginnell reviewed the reissue of the album for Allmusic and wrote that the album "overflows with cunningly devised, first-class tunes" and that Lobo excelled at the use of "sharp scatted syllables" in place of lyrics on some of the songs. Ginnell highlighted Hermeto Pascoal's "playful and enigmatic electric piano and flute multiphonics" and the "multifaceted percussion talents" of Airto Moreira. Ginnell concluded that "Collectors of Brazilian jazz should seek this one out; it is absolutely essential".

Track listing 
 "Zanzibar" (Edu Lobo) – 4:01
 "Ponteio" (Lobo) – 3:03
 "Even Now" (Lani Hall, Lobo) – 2:13
 "Crystal Illusions" (Hall, Lobo) – 6:09
 "Casa Forte" (Lobo) – 3:39
 "Jangada" (Lobo) – 2:25
 "Sharp Tongue" (Hermeto Pascoal) – 2:16
 "To Say Goodbye" (Hall, Lobo, Torquato Neto) – 4:42
 "Hey Jude" (John Lennon, Paul McCartney) – 4:14

Personnel 
Edu Lobo – arranger, conductor, guitar, vocals
Oscar Castro-Neves – guitar
Hermeto Pascoal – arranger, flute, piano, electric piano
Gracinha Leporace – vocals
Norm Herzberg – bassoon
Ronald Cooper, Ray Kramer, Kurt Reher, Eleanor Slatkin – cello
Sebastião Neto – double bass
Airto Moreira – percussion
Claudio Slon – drums
Sergio Mendes – arranger, producer

Production
Leonard Feather, Douglas T. Stewart – liner notes
Joe Foster – producer, recreation
That Hound – mastering
Isthetic – design
Hollis King – art direction
Jim McCrary, Guy Webster – cover photography
Andy Morten – artwork, design
Nick Robbins – recreation

References

1970 albums
Albums produced by Sérgio Mendes
Edu Lobo albums
A&M Records albums
Portuguese-language albums